Cleonice is a genus of flies in the family Tachinidae.

Species
C. callida (Meigen, 1824)
C. keteli Ziegler, 2000
C. nitidiuscula (Zetterstedt, 1859)

References

Tachininae
Tachinidae genera
Taxa named by Jean-Baptiste Robineau-Desvoidy